Alvar Gullichsen (born 1961 in Helsinki, Finland) is a Finnish painter and sculptor. He is most famous for his pop art works and the fictional corporation named Bonk Business which he founded. Gullichsen's works are often absurd machines with no apparent use. 
Alvar Gullichsen was the main designer of the interior of the night club Le Bonk in Helsinki.

Alvar Gullichsen is the son of Finnish architect Kristian Gullichsen and grandchild of art patron Maire Gullichsen.

References

Pop artists
Artists from Helsinki
1961 births
Living people
20th-century Finnish painters
21st-century Finnish painters
21st-century male artists
20th-century Finnish sculptors
21st-century Finnish sculptors
Finnish male painters
Finnish people of Norwegian descent
20th-century Finnish male artists